The Susan S. and Edward J. Cutler House is a historic house in Providence, Rhode Island.  It is an L-shaped -story wood-frame structure, with a gabled roof and a single-story porch and vestibule in the crook of the L. The front facade has a rectangular projecting bay, with panels below the windows, and a bracketed hip roof.  The front and side gables both feature Stick style decorative woodwork.  The entry porch roof is bracketed, matching the front bay, and has a jigsawn balustrade.  The interior features late Victorian woodwork, plasterwork and original hardware.  The house was built in 1880, probably from plans in a published pattern book, and was the first to be built in a relatively new subdivision on Providence's north side.  It is a well-preserved example of a "picturesque cottage", a style popularized by a number of 19th-century architects.

The house was listed on the National Register of Historic Places in 2015.

See also
National Register of Historic Places listings in Providence, Rhode Island

References

Houses on the National Register of Historic Places in Rhode Island
Houses in Providence, Rhode Island
National Register of Historic Places in Providence, Rhode Island